The women's 400 metre freestyle S7 event at the 2016 Paralympic Games took place on 14 September 2016, at the Olympic Aquatics Stadium. No heats were held.

Final 
17:54 14 September 2016:

Notes

Swimming at the 2016 Summer Paralympics